The 228th Mixed Brigade, was a short-lived mixed brigade of the Spanish Republican Army in the Spanish Civil War. It was formed in the last months of the Civil War with battalions belonging to the Carabineros corps. Its first and only leader was the Carabineros Commander Miguel Bascuñana Sánchez.
 
This unit disappeared in early 1939 during the crushing advance of the Francoist armies across Catalonia.

History
The 228th Mixed Brigade was hastily established in December 1938 in La Seu d'Urgell (Seo de Urgel) in the Pyrenees border area. It was organized with the following Carabineros battalions:
21st, which became the 909 Battalion of the mixed brigade. 
39th, which became the 910 Battalion
47th, which became the 911 Battalion
55th, which became the 912 Battalion
Remainders of Spanish troops from the International Brigades after these were disbanded, such as the 47th Battalion of the XII International Brigade, were also integrated in the 228th Mixed Brigade. 

The brigade was theoretically included in the 62nd Division —a division which never became functional— under the XI Army Corps, but in practice it would never be part of the Republican Army division structure.

Unknown end of the brigade
The 228th Mixed Brigade was trusted with the mission of covering a sector of the Lower Ebro zone at the time of the Catalonia Offensive. However, the threat of becoming surrounded by rebel troops soon forced the whole unit to withdraw.
After this there are no further news of the 228th Mixed Brigade.

See also
Carabineros
Group of Eastern Region Armies

References

External links
C López Rovira, La Conquesta de Catalunya; Diari d'Operacions

Military units and formations established in 1938
Military units and formations disestablished in 1939
Mixed Brigades (Spain)
Carabineros